Sutech can mean 
Shiraz University of Technology - a university in Shiraz, Iran
SUTECH - Somaliland University of Technology, Hargeisa, Somaliland
Set (mythology), an ancient Egyptian god of strength, violence, and disorder